The white-shouldered tanager (Loriotus luctuosus) is a medium-sized passerine bird. This tanager is a resident breeder from Honduras to Panama, South America south to Ecuador and southern Brazil, and on Trinidad.

It occurs in forests and cocoa plantations. The bulky cup nest is built in low vegetation, and the female lays three brown-blotched cream eggs.

White-shouldered tanagers are 14 cm long and weigh 14 g. They are long-tailed and with a mostly black stout pointed bill. The adult male is glossy black, apart from white underwing coverts and a conspicuous white shoulder patch. The shoulder patch is the most obvious difference from the similar but larger white-lined tanager, in which the smaller white area is rarely visible except in flight.

Females and immatures have olive upperparts, yellow underparts and a grey head and neck.

These are restless birds which eat mainly insects, including stick insects, but will occasionally take fruit. They often associate with other insectivorous birds in wandering feeding flocks.

The white-shouldered tanager's song is a fast repetitive .

References

 Birds of Venezuela by Hilty, 

white-shouldered tanager
Birds of Honduras
Birds of Nicaragua
Birds of Costa Rica
Birds of Panama
Birds of Colombia
Birds of Venezuela
Birds of Ecuador
Birds of Trinidad and Tobago
Birds of the Guianas
Birds of the Amazon Basin
white-shouldered tanager
Birds of Brazil
Taxobox binomials not recognized by IUCN